Ceri Dallimore (born 2 July 1974) is a Welsh sport shooter.

Dallimore won a gold medal at the 2002 Commonwealth Games in the Women's Smallbore Rifle Prone Pairs event alongside Johanne Brekke. She also competed at the 2006 Commonwealth Games.

References

1974 births
Living people
Welsh female sport shooters
Shooters at the 2002 Commonwealth Games
Shooters at the 2006 Commonwealth Games
Commonwealth Games gold medallists for Wales
Commonwealth Games medallists in shooting
British female sport shooters
Medallists at the 2002 Commonwealth Games